This is a list of former government railway authorities of Australia – often known colloquially in the different states as The Government Railways, and  The State Railways.

For former non-government companies see List of former Australian railway companies

National
Commonwealth Railways
Australian National Railways Commission
National Rail Corporation

New South Wales
New South Wales Government Railways
Public Transport Commission
State Rail Authority
FreightCorp

Queensland
Queensland Railways

South Australia
South Australian Railways
State Transport Authority
TransAdelaide

Tasmania
Tasmanian Government Railways
AN Tasrail

Victoria
Victorian Railways
State Transport Authority
Metropolitan Transit Authority
Public Transport Corporation

Western Australia
Western Australian Government Railways
Westrail
Western Australian Government Railways Commission

See also
Rail transport in Australia
History of rail transport in Australia

 
Railway, Australia
Rail
Australian railway-related lists